Khaliq Ahmad Nizami (5 December 1925 – 4 December 1997) was an Indian historian and diplomat.

Early life and education 

Nizami was born in Amroha, United Provinces, British India. He completed his M.A. in history in 1945, from Meerut College, then affiliated to University of Agra, and he was awarded the LL.B. degree by the same university.

Career

Academic
He joined Aligarh Muslim University, in the Department of History, in 1947. He was a professor there for several years and later served as vice-chancellor (acting) from 3 January 1974 to 30 August 1974. He also served as the dean of the university's Department of History from 3 July 1977 to 30 July 1980. The K. A. Nizami Centre for Quranic Studies at the university is named after him.

Diplomatic
He was India's ambassador to Syria from 1975 to 1977.

Works
 On History and Historians of Medieval India
 Royalty in Medieval India
 The Life & Times of Shaikh Nizam-u'd-din Auliya
 The life and times of Shaikh Farid-ud-din Ganj-i-Shakar
 Some Aspects Of Religion And Politics In India During The 13th Century
 Medieval India: A Miscellany

See also
 Aligarh Muslim University
 List of Aligarh Muslim University alumni

References

External links

Academic staff of Aligarh Muslim University
Historians of South Asia
Indian diplomats
20th-century Indian Muslims
1925 births
1997 deaths
Indian expatriates in Syria